Yann Kitala (born 9 April 1998) is a professional footballer who plays as a forward for  club Le Havre. Born in France, he represented DR Congo at youth international level.

Club career
On 30 August 2019, Kitala joined Lorient on loan from Lyon. He made his debut with Lorient in a 2–0 Ligue 2 win over Clermont on 14 September 2019.

In June 2020, Kitala moved to Sochaux on a three-year contract. Sochaux paid a transfer of €300,000 plus a potential €500,000 in bonuses.

On 13 July 2022, Kitala signed a three-year contract with Le Havre.

International career
Born in France, Kitala is of Congolese descent. He represented the DR Congo U20s in a friendly against the England U20s on 7 October 2015.

References

External links
 
 LFP Profile

1998 births
Living people
Footballers from Paris
Citizens of the Democratic Republic of the Congo through descent
Democratic Republic of the Congo footballers
Democratic Republic of the Congo youth international footballers
French footballers
French sportspeople of Democratic Republic of the Congo descent
Black French sportspeople
Association football forwards
FC Lorient players
FC Sochaux-Montbéliard players
Le Havre AC players
Ligue 2 players
Championnat National 2 players